Artemisia bigelovii is a North American species of sagebrush known by the common name Bigelow sagebrush or flat sagebrush. It grows in the deserts of the southwestern United States.

Distribution
It is native to California (Inyo + San Bernardino Counties), Arizona, Nevada, Utah, Colorado, New Mexico, and Texas. It grows in desert, basin, grassland, and juniper woodland habitats. It is very drought-tolerant and lives in arid regions on sandy and limestone-rich soils.

Description
Artemisia bigelovii  is a shrub growing from a woody base and reaching a maximum height around 50 cm (20 inches). It has many slender, curving branches with shredding bark and is generally in overall habit.

The stem branches and leaves are coated in silvery hairs, giving the plant a gray color. The leaves are less than 3 centimeters long and may end in a point or in three distinct teeth.

The inflorescence is a panicle of flower heads containing yellowish disc florets and occasionally a small ray floret. The fruit is a tiny achene about a millimeter long.

Uses
This species of sagebrush is good winter fodder for grazing animals and it is cultivated as plant cover on recovering rangeland and for erosion control.

References

External links
Jepson Manual Treatment

Southwest Colorado Wildflowers
SEINet Arizona Chapter, Artemisia bigelovii A. Gray
United States Department of the Interior, National Park Service, Arches National Park, Bigelow's Sagebrush (Bigelow's Sage; Big Basin Sagebrush)

bigelovii
Flora of the Southwestern United States
Flora of the South-Central United States
Flora of the California desert regions
Flora of Colorado
Flora of the Colorado Plateau and Canyonlands region
Natural history of the Mojave Desert
Fodder
Plants described in 1857
Flora without expected TNC conservation status